Percy is a 1971 film soundtrack for the British comedy film Percy performed by the English rock group the Kinks with additional orchestral arrangements conducted by Stanley Myers. It was released as the band’s ninth official studio album. The songs were written by Ray Davies and include both standard rock/pop songs and instrumental numbers.

Singles and compilations 

"God's Children" was issued as a single (b/w either "Moments" or "The Way Love Used to Be", depending on the country) in April 1971. In the UK a 4-track EP was also released featuring "God's Children", "The Way Love Used To Be", "Moments" and "Dreams". This was the Kinks' last release with Pye while they were still under contract. Unlike the album, the single was released in the US (in July) but failed to chart there or in the UK. It was a minor hit in Australia (reaching #53) and New Zealand (#21). In the US the tracks "God's Children" and "Willesden Green" were included on The Kink Kronikles compilation in 1972. "The Way Love Used to Be" was included on 1973's The Great Lost Kinks Album.

"Willesden Green" is the only song released by the Kinks to feature lead vocals by a band member other than a Davies brother. Bassist John Dalton sings lead vocals on the track, doing an impression of Elvis Presley.

Never released in the US, this album was by far the most commonly imported to the US of all of the Kinks' Pye albums.  Both Jem and Imports Unlimited kept this album on their import lists throughout the 1970s.

Track listing 

The 2014 deluxe edition of Percy is the second disc of the Lola versus Powerman and the Moneygoround, Part One deluxe edition. The 2-disc set is titled Lola versus Powerman and the Moneygoround & Percy.

Personnel 
According to band researcher Doug Hinman:

The Kinks
Ray Davieslead vocals, acoustic and electric guitars; harmonica 
Dave Daviesbacking vocals, electric and acoustic guitars
John Daltonbass guitar; lead vocals 
Mick Avorydrums
John Goslingbaby grand piano, Hammond organ, electric piano

Additional musicians
Stanley Myersstring arrangements
The Mike Cotton Soundhorns

References

Sources

External links

The Kinks soundtrack albums
1971 soundtrack albums
Pye Records soundtracks
Albums recorded at Morgan Sound Studios
Comedy film soundtracks